Akhuryan is a village in the Akhuryan Municipality of the Shirak Province of Armenia. The Statistical Committee of Armenia reported its population was 7,113 as per the 2011 official census down from 9,696 at the 2001 census.

Demographics

Notable people
Varsham Boranyan, European champion in Greco-Roman wrestling
Levon Geghamyan, Greco-Roman wrestler

References

External links
About Akhuryan region

Communities in Shirak Province
Populated places in Shirak Province